Ravagers is a 1979 American science fiction action film directed by Richard Compton and based on the 1966 novel Path to Savagery by Robert Edmond Alter. The screenplay concerns survivors of a nuclear holocaust, who do what they can to protect themselves against ravagers, a mutated group of vicious marauders who terrorize the few remaining civilized inhabitants.

Plot
In the aftermath of a nuclear holocaust, animal-like creatures known as "the ravagers" roam the earth and kill all survivors.  A man named Falk (Richard Harris) witnesses his wife's murder by the creatures. Seeking vengeance, Falk becomes a vigilante.

He joins a small community, led by Rann (Ernest Borgnine), living aboard a ship anchored off shore. The ship is destroyed in an attack by the ravagers. Falk then leads his fellow survivors on a desperate quest for a place where they can live in peace.

Cast
 Richard Harris as Falk
 Ernest Borgnine as Rann
 Anthony James as Ravager leader
 Art Carney as Sergeant
 Ann Turkel as Faina
 Alana Stewart as Miriam
 Woody Strode as Brown
 Seymour Cassel as Blind Lawyer
 Harvey Evans as Prison Guard
 Arch Archambault as Ravager #1
 Olivia Barton as Mushroom Woman
 Kate Bray as Grace
 Billy Carmack as Thug with Sickle
 Brian Carney as Foy
 Kim Crow as Flocker Woman
 Bob Westmoreland as Hank
 Kurt Grayson as Coop
 Gordon Hyde as Bert
 Steve Lashley as Ravager #2
 George Stokes as Bant
 Andre Tayir as Prisoner

Production
The film was shot at the Alabama Space and Rocket Center and at the "Three Caves Quarry" at the base of Monte Sano in Huntsville, Alabama. The Three Caves location is unique because it was one of the first limestone quarries in Alabama and for a brief time in 1962 a possible fallout shelter.

Releases
Ravagers is part of a long line of Hollywood-backed post-apocalyptic films from the 1970s which are difficult to find on television or home video. In the UK the film was released on Betamax and VHS, where Alana Stewart's voice was dubbed by actress Molly Wryn.

Reception

The Los Angeles Times called Ravagers "handsomely produced but relentlessly dull... doesn't have enough story to tell."

References

External links
 
Behind-the-scenes production photos Collection of Stephen Lodge.

1979 films
1970s science fiction action films
American science fiction action films
Columbia Pictures films
1970s English-language films
Films scored by Fred Karlin
Films set in 1991
Films shot in Alabama
Films shot at the U.S. Space & Rocket Center
Films directed by Richard Compton
American post-apocalyptic films
1970s American films